Maracay is a city in north-central Venezuela, near the Caribbean coast, and is the capital and most important city of the state of Aragua. Most of it falls under the jurisdiction of Girardot Municipality. The population of Maracay and its surroundings in the 2011 census was 955,362. In Venezuela, Maracay is known as "Ciudad Jardín" ("Garden City").

History 

Officially established on March 5, 1701 by Bishop Diego de Baños y Sotomayor in the valleys of Tocopio and Tapatapa (what is known today as the central valley of Aragua) in northern Venezuela.

According to the most accepted explanation, it was named after a local indigenous chief, and refers to the "Maracayo" (Felis mitis), a small tiger. Alternative etymologies cite a local aromatic tree called Mara.

Maracay experienced rapid growth during Juan Vicente Gómez's dictatorship (1908–1935). Gómez saw Maracay as a suitable place to make his residence during his rule, and ordered the construction of an Arc of Triumph, a bull plaza (a near replica of the one in Seville, Spain), an Ópera house, a Zoo, and, most notably, the Hotel Jardín (Garden Hotel), a majestic, tourist attraction with very large gardens. The city is home to the Mausoleo de Gómez (Gómez's mausoleum), where the dictator's remains are stored.

Economy and transport 

One of the most important cities in Venezuela, Maracay is primarily an industrial and commercial center, the city produces paper, textiles chemicals, tobacco, cement, cattle, processed foods, soap, and perfumes.

The areas around Maracay are agricultural: sugarcane, tobacco, coffee and cocoa stand out as the main products. There are also cattle-herding and timber-cutting activities. Activity by the Venezuelan Military also adds a great deal to Maracay's economy.

Maracay has good transportation facilities and infrastructure. The city is linked to most other important localities by the Autopista Regional del Centro (Central Regional Highway). It also has good access to Venezuela's small national railway system. The city boasts the national Hydroplane airport, located on the shore of the Lago de Valencia (Lake of Valencia). The city does not have a subway system, but one is in the planning stages.

Maracay has two airports. The Airport Mariscal Sucre (IATA MCY ICAO SVBS) and the military Air Base El Libertador (IATA MYC ICAO SVBL)

Military 
Maracay is a city heavily influenced by the military. Maracay is the cradle of Venezuelan aviation, and it is home to the two largest Air Force bases in the country. The Venezuelan F-16 fighter planes are stationed here, as well as the new Sukhoi-30MKEs acquired by the Venezuelan Government.

Other military facilities include the Fourth Armored Division of the Army and the airborne training center and barracks of the 42nd Airborne Brigade.

It is also home to the government-owned ammunition and weapons factory (CAVIM) that produces the Venezuelan version of the FN FAL (Fusil Automatique Leger - Light Automatic Rifle) rifle and the AK-103s; as well as the ammunition for both models.

Natural reserves 
The mountains on the north side of Maracay, that separate it from the coast, make up the Henri Pittier National Park, named after the Swiss naturalist that studied them. The park is a very lush rainforest, with a great variety of ferns.  Two very winding roads cut through the park over the mountains to the coast. One, beginning at the North-Central part of the city known as Urbanización El Castaño, goes to the beach town of Choroní. The other, beginning at the North-Western part at the city of El Limón, goes to Ocumare de la Costa and the beaches of Cata and Cuyagua.

Higher educational institutions and cultural venues 

 
 
Maracay houses the Faculty of Veterinarians and Agronomy of the Universidad Central de Venezuela, and an extension of the Universidad de Carabobo.

The main Campus of the UNEFA (a military university open to civilians) is located here. Career choices include, Electronics, Aeronautical and Civil Engineering, as well as other disciplines such as avionics.

Museums
The main museums are:
 The Anthropological Museum.
 The Aviation Museum.
 The Museum of Modern Arts "Mario Abreu".
 The Opera House.

Religion
The Patron Saint is Saint Joseph.

The San Sebastian's Walk is a religious catholic event with ecological and sport characteristics, which takes place the 20th of January of each year in the outskirts of the city of Maracay.

City has Serbian community and Serbian Orthodox church.

The city has no synagogue. However, nine indigenous inhabitants converted to Conservative Judaism in Valencia in 2014 after a three-year study course. In 2016, they were denied the right to emigrate to Israel by the Israeli Ministry of Interior, under the assumption that they failed to "belong to a Jewish community" in Maracay.

Sports
Maracay is the home of the local baseball team Tigres de Aragua.

The city's Bullfight arena is the only "Maestranza" (bullfighting school) in the country. At the present day is called "Maestranza Cesar Girón"

Gallery Images

Mass media 
 TV Stations: TVS, TVR (Orbivisión), Color TV, TIC TV (Televisión Informativa del Centro), Novavisión TV, Aragua TV.
 Newspapers: El Aragüeño, El Periodiquito, El Siglo, El Impreso
 Maracay in the web: maracaycity.net, MaracayUp, Maracay Extrema, En Aragua, Ciudad Maracay

Notable people

 Bobby Abreu, baseball player
 Juan Arango, soccer player
 José Altuve, baseball player
 Elvis Andrus, baseball player
 La Divaza, youtuber and singer
 Juan-Carlos Bianchi, tennis player
 Miguel Cabrera, baseball player
 Alberto Callaspo, baseball player
 David Concepción, baseball player
 Canserbero, rapper
 Kervin Castro, baseball player
 Yonathan Daza, baseball player
 Gaby Espino, actress, model and TV presenter
 , bullfighter
 Carlos Guillén, baseball player
 Gabriela Isler, Miss Universe 2013
 Luis Laguna, musician and songwriter
 Pilín León, Miss World 1981
 Alicia Machado, Miss Universe 1996
 Manuel Maldonado, racing driver
 Pastor Maldonado, Formula One driver
 Omar Narváez, baseball player
 Martín Prado, baseball player
 Sebastian Rivero, baseball player
 Maira Alexandra Rodriguez, Miss Earth Water 2014
 Aníbal Sánchez, baseball player
 Jorge Valdivia, soccer player

References

External links 
 Official site of the Girardot Municipality
 Map of Maracay
 Ciudad Maracay. Information about Maracay and Aragua State

 
Cities in Aragua
Populated places established in 1701
1701 establishments in the New Kingdom of Granada